C2CD4D, or C2 calcium-dependent domain-containing protein 4D is a protein product of the human genome.  The gene that codes for this protein is found on chromosome 1, from 150,076,963 to 150,079,657. The gene contains 2 exons and encodes 353 amino acids.  Synonyms for C2CD4D are "FAM148D" and NP_001129475.  C2CD4D contains a conserved metal binding domain that is a known as Protein kinase C conserved region 2, subgroup 1. This motif is known to be a member of the C2 superfamily, which is present in phospholipases, protein kinases C, and synaptotagmins.  The amino acid sequence of C2CD4D can be accessed at  Prior to any post translational modification, C2CD4D has a molecular weight of 37.6 kdal.  Although scientists have not yet determined where C2CD4D functions within the cell, C2CD4D has a predicted isoelectric point of 11.636 which severely limits the places in which it can be effective. In addition, C2CD4D does not contain any predicted transmembrane domains or any predicted signal peptides.

Expression 
According to the National Center for Biotechnology Information, C2CD4D has only been found to be expressed in adult individuals with some form of cancer.  C2CD4D is not ubiquitously expressed, and thus far scientists have only found C2CD4D expressed in the tissues of the brain, intestine, and mammary gland.

Evolutionary conservation 
There are 52 known mammalian orthologs for C2CD4D, found in at least 10 species including Pan troglodytes, Ornithorhynchus anatinus, and Sus scrofa.  There are a total of 38 completely conserved residues across these 10 species, corresponding to 10.76% conservation.  Within vertebrates conservation remains high at 33 residues, corresponding to 9.3%.  However, outside of vertebrates, conservation drops to a maximum of 1.98%, or 3 residues.

References 

Genes on human chromosome 1